The 2017–18 2. Liga is the 25th season of the 2. Liga in Slovakia, since its establishment in 1993. It began on 28 July 2017 and concluded on 20 May 2018.

Teams

Team changes

Stadiums and locations

Personnel and kits

League table

Statistics

Top goalscorers

References

External links

2
2017-18
Slovak